Gornergrat is the upper terminal railway station of the Gornergrat railway, a rack railway which links it with the resort of Zermatt. The station is situated at the summit of the Gornergrat, in the Swiss municipality of Zermatt and canton of Valais.

Near the station is the Kulm Hotel, a hotel and observatory.

See also 
List of highest railway stations in Switzerland
List of buildings and structures above 3000 m in Switzerland

References

External links 
 
 

Railway stations in the canton of Valais
Gornergrat Railway stations
Railway stations in Switzerland opened in 1898